A senatorial election was held on November 10, 1959 in the Philippines. The 1959 elections were known as the 1959 Philippine midterm elections as the date when the elected officials take office falls halfway through President Carlos P. Garcia's four-year term.

The Liberal Party continued chipping away from the Nacionalista Party's dominance in the Senate, winning two more seats, although the Nacionalistas still possessed 19 out of 24 seats in the chamber.

Retiring incumbents

Nacionalista Party
Alejo Mabanag

Mid-term vacancies
Ruperto Kangleon (Democratic), died on February 28, 1958

Results
The Nacionalista Party won five seats contested in the election, while the Liberal Party won two, and the Nationalist Citizens' Party won one.

Lorenzo Tañada of the Nationalist Citizens' Party and Nacionalistas Mariano Jesús Cuenco, Fernando Lopez, and Eulogio Rodriguez defended their Senate seats. Lopez was originally from the Democratic Party, and ran as a Nacionalista on this election.

The two winning Liberals are neophyte senators: Estanislao Fernandez and Ferdinand Marcos. Also entering the Senate for the first time are Nacionalistas Alejandro Almendras and Genaro Magsaysay.

Incumbent Nacionalista senators Edmundo B. Cea and Emmanuel Pelaez both lost.

Key:
 ‡ Seats up
 + Gained by a party from another party
 √ Held by the incumbent
 * Held by the same party with a new senator
 ^ Vacancy

Per candidate

Per party

See also
Commission on Elections
4th Congress of the Philippines

References

External links
 Official website of the Commission on Elections

1959
Senate election